Unalaska City School District (UCSD) is a school district headquartered in Unalaska, Alaska.

There are two schools:
Eagles View Elementary Achigaalux
Unalaska City High School

Circa October 1978 the district had 15 teachers and 140 students.

References

External links
 

School districts in Alaska
Unalaska, Alaska
Education in Unorganized Borough, Alaska